= Shumansville, Virginia =

Unincorporated community in Virginia, United States

Coordinates: 37°55′56″N 77°16′44″W

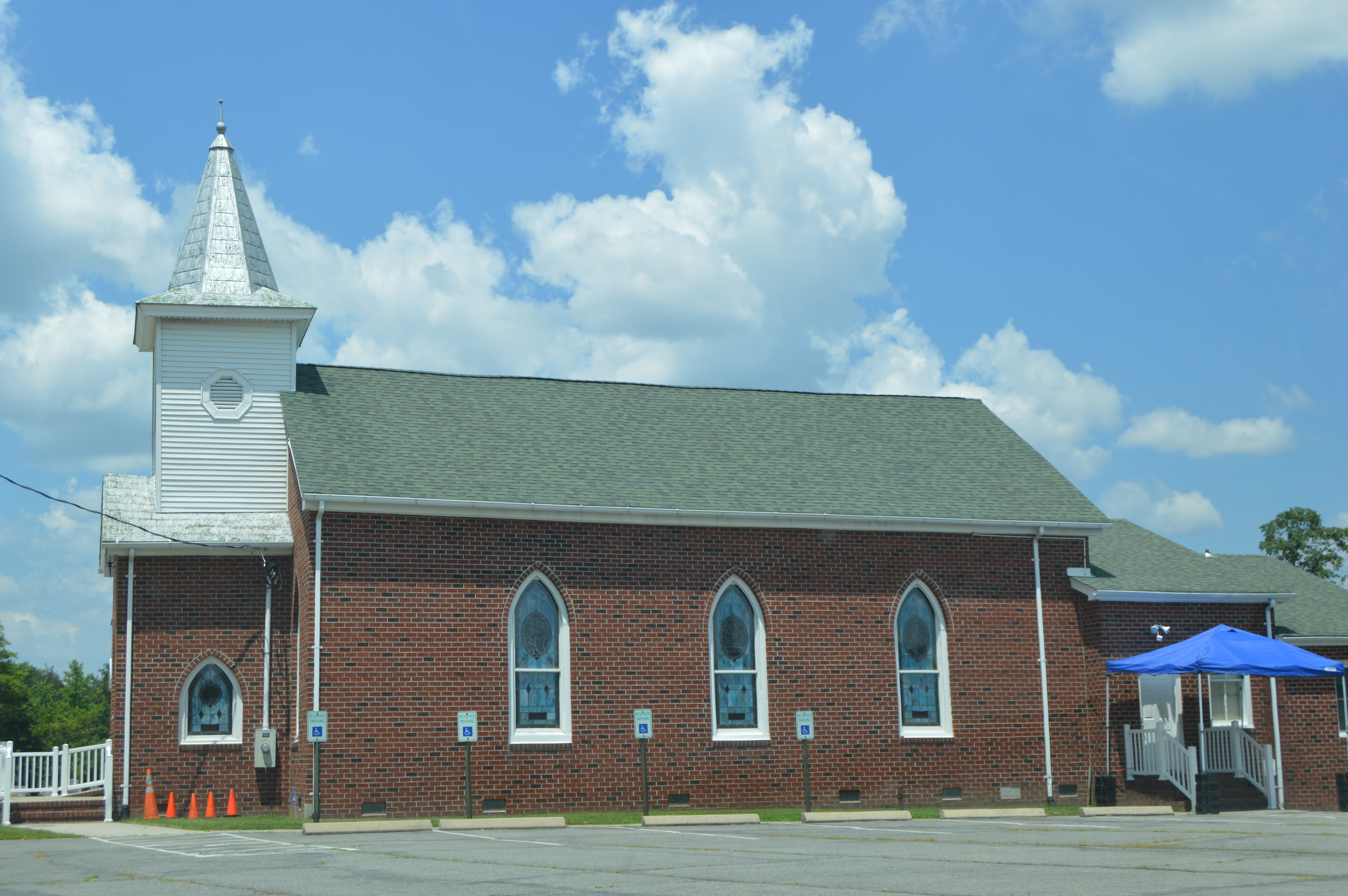
Mount Tabor Baptist Church

Shumansville is an unincorporated community in Caroline County, in the U.S. state of Virginia.
